A limerick is a form of verse, usually humorous and frequently rude, in five-line, predominantly  trimeter with a strict rhyme scheme of AABBA, in which the first, second and fifth line rhyme, while the third and fourth lines are shorter and share a different rhyme.  The following example is a limerick of unknown origin:

The form appeared in England in the early years of the 18th century. It was popularized by Edward Lear in the 19th century, although he did not use the term. Gershon Legman, who compiled the largest and most scholarly anthology, held that the true limerick as a folk form is always obscene, and cites similar opinions by Arnold Bennett and George Bernard Shaw, describing the clean limerick as a "periodic fad and object of magazine contests, rarely rising above mediocrity". From a folkloric point of view, the form is essentially transgressive; violation of taboo is part of its function.

Form

The standard form of a limerick is a stanza of five lines, with the first, second and fifth rhyming with one another and having three feet of three syllables each; and the shorter third and fourth lines also rhyming with each other, but having only two feet of three syllables. The third and fourth lines are usually anapaestic, or one iamb followed by one anapaest. The first, second and fifth are usually either anapaests or amphibrachs.

The first line traditionally introduces a person and a place, with the place appearing at the end of the first line and establishing the rhyme scheme for the second and fifth lines. In early limericks, the last line was often essentially a repeat of the first line, although this is no longer customary.

Within the genre, ordinary speech stress is often distorted in the first line, and may be regarded as a feature of the form: "There was a young man from the coast"; "There once was a girl from Detroit..." Legman takes this as a convention whereby prosody is violated simultaneously with propriety. Exploitation of geographical names, especially exotic ones, is also common, and has been seen as invoking memories of geography lessons in order to subvert the decorum taught in the schoolroom; Legman finds that the exchange of limericks is almost exclusive to comparatively well-educated males, women figuring in limericks almost exclusively as "villains or victims". The most prized limericks incorporate a kind of twist, which may be revealed in the final line or lie in the way the rhymes are often intentionally tortured, or both. Many limericks show some form of internal rhyme, alliteration or assonance, or some element of word play. Verses in limerick form are sometimes combined with a refrain to form a limerick song, a traditional humorous drinking song often with obscene verses.

David Abercrombie, a phonetician, takes a different view of the limerick. It is this: Lines one, two, and five have three feet, that is to say three stressed syllables, while lines three and four have two stressed syllables.  The number and placement of the unstressed syllables is rather flexible.  There is at least one unstressed syllable between the stresses but there may be more – as long as there are not so many as to make it impossible to keep the equal spacing of the stresses.

Etymology
The origin of the name limerick for this type of poem is debated. The name is generally taken to be a reference to the City or County of Limerick in Ireland sometimes particularly to the Maigue Poets, and may derive from an earlier form of nonsense verse parlour game that traditionally included a refrain that included "Will [or won't] you come (up) to Limerick?"

Although the New English Dictionary records the first usage of the word limerick for this type of poem in England in 1898 and in the United States in 1902, in recent years several earlier examples have been documented, the earliest being an 1880 reference, in a Saint John, New Brunswick newspaper, to an apparently well-known tune,

Edward Lear

The limerick form was popularized by Edward Lear in his first A Book of Nonsense (1846) and a later work, More Nonsense Pictures, Rhymes, Botany, etc. (1872). Lear wrote 212 limericks, mostly considered nonsense literature. It was customary at the time for limericks to accompany an absurd illustration of the same subject, and for the final line of the limerick to be a variant of the first line ending in the same word, but with slight differences that create a nonsensical, circular effect. The humour is not in the "punch line" ending but rather in the tension between meaning and its lack.

The following is an example of one of Edward Lear's limericks.

Lear's limericks were often typeset in three or four lines, according to the space available under the accompanying picture.

Variations

The limerick form is so well known that it has been parodied in many ways. The following example is of unknown origin:

Other parodies deliberately break the rhyme scheme, like the following example, attributed to W.S. Gilbert:

Comedian John Clarke also parodied Lear's style:

The American film reviewer Ezra Haber Glenn has blended the limerick form with reviews of popular films, creating so-called "filmericks".  For example, on Vittorio De Sica's Italian neorealist Bicycle Thieves:

The British wordplay and recreational mathematics expert Leigh Mercer (1893–1977) devised the following mathematical limerick:

This is read as follows:

See also

References

Bibliography
 Baring-Gould, William Stuart and Ceil Baring-Gould (1988). The Annotated Mother Goose, New York: Random House.
 Brandreth, Gyles (1986). Everyman's Word Games
 Cohen, Gerald (compiler) (October–November 2010). "Stephen Goranson's research into _limerick_: a preliminary report". Comments on Etymology vol. 40, no. 1–2. pp. 2–11.
 Legman, Gershon (1964). The Horn Book, University Press.
 Legman, Gershon (1988). The Limerick, New York:Random House.
 Loomis, C. Grant (July, 1963). Western Folklore, Vol. 22, No. 3
 Wells, Carolyn (1903). A Nonsense Anthology, Charles Scribner's Sons.

External links

 Norman Douglas, Some Limericks Cypher Press reprint.
 Edward Lear's A Book of Nonsense from Project Gutenberg
 "Aesthetic Realism and Expression", a lecture by Eli Siegel using Edward Lear's iconic limericks from A Book of Nonsense .
 OEDILF – A limerick dictionary
  Jenni Nuttall, "#notalimerick"
 'Limericks (5-line verse)' file at Limerick City Library, Ireland
 There Once Was a Serpent: A History of Theology in Limericks, Richard Kieckhefer

Limerick bibliographies 
 Deex, Arthur, Arthur Deex's comprehensive annotated Limerick Bibliography
 Dilcher, Karl, The Karl Dilcher bibliography of limerick books.
 "Limerick Poems and Civil Wars" (on the origin of the name) 
 "The Curious Story of the Limerick" Dr Matthew Potter published by Limerick Writers' Centre Publishing www.limerickwriterscentre.com

Stanzaic form
Word play
Humorous poems
Poetic forms